Blepephaeus modicus is a species of beetle in the family Cerambycidae. It was described by Charles Joseph Gahan in 1888. It is known from India.

References

Blepephaeus
Beetles described in 1888